The Sangoan is the name given by archaeologists to a Palaeolithic tool manufacturing style which may have developed from the earlier Acheulian types. In addition to the Acheulian stone tools, bone and antler picks were also used. Sangoan toolkits were used especially for grubbing.

The Sangoan period is broadly analogous to the Mousterian culture in Europe and is dated to about 130,000 to 10,000 years ago.

It is named after the site of Sango Bay in Uganda where it was first discerned in 1920. Although Desmond Clark considered the complex to be tied to the tropical forest, the peoples who used Sangoan tools were hunting and gathering cultures, also known as the Sangoan, occupied southern Africa in areas where annual rainfall now is less than 40 inches (1016 mm) and Central African areas whose rainfall is above 2000 mm from the beginning of the Upper Paleolithic period.  
The Sangoan industry was distributed broadly from present day Botswana to Ethiopia and from Uganda to Angola and Gabon. In the Kalahari Desert, many prehistoric stone tools have been recovered by archaeologists dating at least as early as the period of the Sangoan culture. It also went as far north as the forested regions of the Congo. Confusion exists within literature as to whether to call this early percussion-made bifacial complex, with certain writers stating the term Lupembum,  or the term Sangoan. There are two complexes: Sangoan, with mainly percussion technique and no formal projectivel points, and Lupemban, with indirect or direct pressure flaking and formal projectile points.

Notes

References
 C. Michael Hogan. 2008. "Makgadikgadi" at Burnham, A. (editor) The Megalithic Portal
 Robert Linville Hoover. 1974. A review of the Sangoan industrial complex in Africa, 76 pages
 D.W. Phillipson. 2005. African archaeology, page 81 of 389 pages
 J. Janmart. 1953. The Kalahari Sands of the Lunda (N.-E. Angola), their earlier redistributions and the Sangoan culture, 64 p.

Paleolithic cultures of Africa
Archaeology of Central Africa
Archaeology of Southern Africa
Archaeology of Eastern Africa